The following is an incomplete list of current and defunct magazines published in the United Kingdom.

0–9

 3D World
 3rd Stone
 5 Magazine
 10 Magazine
 20x20 magazine
 125 Magazine
 360
 360 Gamer
 1843
 2000 AD
 8000 Plus

A

 Ablaze!
 ACE
 Acoustic
 Acumen
 Al-Ādab wa-l-Fann
 Aeon
 Aeroplane
 Aesthetica
 Airfix Magazine
 Airfix Model World
 All About Space
 All Out Cricket
 Alternative Ulster
 Amateur Gardening
 Amateur Photographer
 The Amazing Pudding
 Ambit
 Amiga Action
 Amiga Computing
 Amiga Force
 Amiga Format
 Amiga Power
 Amiga Survivor
 The Amorist
 Amstrad Action
 Amstrad Computer User
 Amtix
 Anarchy
 Ancient Egypt
 Angel Exhaust
 Angler's Mail
 Anglia
 The Anglo-Welsh Review
 The Angry Pacifist
 Anime UK
 Another Magazine
 Another Man
 The Antiquary
 The Arab
 Arbeter Fraynd
 The Archaeologist
 Archery UK
 Archive
 Arena
 Arena Three
 Arena Homme +
 Areté
 Are You Scared To Get Happy?
 Artcore Fanzine
 Art Monthly
 The Artist
 Artrocker
 Asbri
 Asian Babes
 Asian Woman magazine
 Aslan
 Astronomy Now
 Atari User
 The Athenaeum
 Athletics Weekly
 AtomAge
 Attitude
 Audio Arts
 Authentic Science Fiction
 The Authors' Circular
 Autocar
 Auto Express
 Autosport
 AXM

B

 Babel
 Bachtrack
 Back Street Heroes
 BackTrack
 Bad Idea
 Barn
 Bass Guitar
 BBC CountryFile
 BBC Focus on Africa
 BBC Gardeners' World
 BBC Good Food
 BBC History
 BBC Knowledge
 BBC MindGames
 BBC Music Magazine
 BBC Science Focus
 BBC Sky at Night
 BBC Wildlife
 Bearded
 Beat Instrumental
 Bella
 Bella Caledonia
 Bent
 Bi Community News
 Big Cheese
 The Big Issue
 Big K
 Bit-Tech
 Bizarre
 Black Music
 Black Static
 Black Velvet
 Blackwood's Magazine
 Blast
 Bliss
 Blitz
 The Blizzard
 BlueSci
 Bluff Europe
 The Bookseller
 Borderline
 The Botanical Register
 The Boudoir
 Boxing Monthly
 Boxing News
 Boys of England
 Boys' World
 Boyz
 Brand
 Bristol in Stereo
 Britanskii Soiuznik
 British Bandsman
 British Birds
 British Chess Magazine
 British Film
 British Journal of Photography
 British Philatelic Bulletin
 British Railways Illustrated
 British Vogue
 British Wildlife
 Broadcast
 Bucketfull of Brains
 The Burlington Magazine
 Bwletin Cymdeithas Emynau Cymru

C

 The Call
 Cambrian Quarterly Magazine and Celtic Repertory
 Cambridge Literary Review
 Camerawork
 Candis Magazine
 Canoe & Kayak UK
 Cantab
 Careless Talk Costs Lives
 The Cauldron
 Cavalcade
 Chambers's Edinburgh Journal
 The Chap
 Chapman
 Chartist
 Chat
 The Cheese Grater
 The Chemical Engineer
 Chemistry World
 Chess Magazine
 Chic
 Chroma: A Queer Literary Journal
 Cinema Retro
 Cinema X
 City Life
 Clash
 Classic FM Magazine
 Classic Pop
 Classic Rock
 Classical Music
 Classical Recordings Quarterly
 Close Up
 Closer
 Club International
 Coast
 Collecticus
 Comics International
 Commodore Force
 Commodore Format
 Commodore User
 Common Sense
 Company
 Computer and Video Games
 Computer Gamer
 Computer Music
 Computer Shopper
 Constructor Quarterly
 Contemporary
 Co-op News
 The Cornhill Magazine
 Corsetry and Underwear
 Country Homes & Interiors
 Country Life
 Crack
 The Crack
 Craft&design
 Craftsman Magazine
 Crash
 Creative Review
 The Cremorne
 The Critic
 Cross Rhythms
 The Cricketer
 Current World Archaeology
 Curry Club Magazine
 Curry Life
 Curtis's Botanical Magazine
 Custom PC
 Cycle Sport
 Cycling Active
 Cycling Plus
 Cycling Weekly
 Cycling World
 Cyclist

D

 Dancing Times
 The Dandy
 The Dark Side
 Dazed
 DC-UK
 Deadline
 Decanter
 Delayed Gratification
 Delta
 Diecast Collector
 Digitiser
 Diogenes
 Disability Now
 Disc
 Disco 45
 Dispatches
 Diva
 DIY
 Doctor Who Magazine
 Documentary News Letter
 Dodgem Logic
 Dork
 Dos Fraye Vort
 Drapers
 Dreamwatch
 Drowned in Sound
 DVD Monthly

E

 The Eagle
 The Ecologist
 The Economist
 ECOS
 Edge
 Electronics World
 Emel
 Emancipation and Liberation
 Empire
 Energy Matters
 Encounter
 The ENDS Report
 Engineering
 The Engineer
 The English Mechanic and World of Science
 English Review (18th century)
 The English Review
 The Englishwoman's Domestic Magazine
 English Woman's Journal
 Entertain Magazine
 ENZK
 Eon
 Erotic Review
 Escape
 Escort
 Esquire
 Essentials
 Ethical Consumer
 Ethos
 Eve
 Ever Manifesto
 Everyman
 Eurofruit
 Euromoney
 The European Magazine
 Exit
 Eye
 Eye Spy Magazine

F

 F1 Racing
 The Face
 Fact
 Fadew
 Fairy Chess Review
 Family Circle
 The Family Friend
 Far Out Magazine
 Farmers Guide
 Fast Car
 Feel Good Food
 Fest Magazine
 FHM
 Fiasco
 The Field
 Fiesta
 Filament
 Films and Filming
 Film Review
 Film Weekly
 Fireworks
 First Empire: The International Magazine for the Napoleonic Enthusiast, Historian, and Gamer
 FirstPlay
 The First Post
 Five Star Magazine
 Flintshire Historical Society journal
 The Fly
 Folk Review
 Fortean Times
 Fortnight
 The Fortnightly Review
 FourFourTwo
 The Freethinker
 frieze
 Front
 fRoots
 Future Music
 Fyne Times

G

 g3
 G&Y
 gal-dem
 Gamereactor
 GamesMaster
 GamesMaster International
 GamesTM
 Games-X
 Gandalf's Garden
 Gay Left
 Gay Times
 Gayming Magazine
 Gemma
 Gift Focus
 Girl
 Girl Illustrated
 Girl Talk
 The Glasgow Looking Glass
 Glasgow University Magazine
 Gloucestershire Notes and Queries
 Gold Dust
 Golf Course News International
 Golf Monthly
 Golf Punk
 Golwg
 Gower
 Gramophone
 Grand Designs
 Granta
 The Great Outdoors
 Green Anarchist
 Groundtastic
 Guitarist
 The Games Machine
 The Garden
 The Gentleman's Magazine
 The Gentlewoman
 The Glade
 The Guardian Weekly

H

 H&E naturist
 Harpies and Quines
 Hazards
 Heat
 Heatwave
 Hello!
 Heritage Commercials
 Hero
 Hi-Fi News & Record Review
 Hip Hop Connection
 History Today
 Holidaymaker
 Holyrood
 Home Chat
 Home Notes
 Honey
 Hotdog
 The House Magazine
 House of Hammer
 Huck

I

 i-D
 Ideal Home
 The Idler (1892–1911)
 The Idler (1993)
 Illustrated Sporting and Dramatic News
 Imagine
 ImagineFX
 Impact (action entertainment magazine)
 Impact (student magazine)
 Index on Censorship
 The Individual
 InStyle UK
 International Cycle Sport
 International Socialism
 International Trade Today
 Internet Advisor
 Internet Magazine
 Interzone
 Is this music?
 The Isis Magazine
 ITNOW

J

 Jack
 Jack and Jill
 The Jackdaw
 Jackie
 Jackpot
 Jazz Journal
 Jazzwise
 Journalist
 Jupiter
 Judge Dredd Megazine
 Judy
 Just Seventeen

K

 Khamsin
 Kerrang!
 KIOSK
 Knave
 Koi
 Krazy

L

 La Belle Assemblée
 Labour Briefing
 The Lady's Magazine
 The Lady's Monthly Museum
 The Lady's Museum
 The Lady's Realm
 Lancashire Life
 Land&Liberty
 Land and Water
 The Land Magazine
 LeftLion
 Let It Rock
 The Leveller
 The Liberal
 Liberator
 That's Life
 Lifescape
 The Line of Best Fit
 Linux Format
 The List
 The Listener
  Little White Lies
 Liverpool Software Gazette
 Living Marxism
 The Living Tradition
 Loaded
 Lobster
 Locomotive, Railway Carriage & Wagon Review
 The London Aphrodite
 London Bulletin
 London Review of Books
 Look
 Look-in
 Loud and Quiet
 Love
 Love it!
 Lula
 Lusso
 Luxury Briefing

M

 MacFormat
 Mad About Boys
 The Mag
 Magazine of Female Fashions of London & Paris
 Manchester Climate Monthly
 Marie Claire
 Marketing
 Marmalade
 Marxism Today
 Match
 Max Power
 Mayfair
 MCV
 Mean Machines
 Mega
 Mega Drive Advanced Gaming
 Mega Power
 MegaTech
 Megaton
 Melody Maker
 Men's Fitness
 Men's Health
 Men Only
 Men's World
 Mersey Beat
 Metal Forces
 Metal Hammer
 Minx
 Mixmag
 Mobile Choice
 Model Engineer
 Model Engineers' Workshop
 Modern Painters
 Modern Railways
 Modern Review
 Mojo
 The Monthly Film Bulletin
 Monthly Magazine
 mookychick
 More!
 Motor Boat & Yachting
 Motor Boats Monthly
 Motor Sport
 Mountain Bike Rider
 Mountain Biking UK
 MP3
 Mslexia
 Murky Depths
 Muscle & Fitness
 Museums Journal
 MusicOMH
 Music Week
 Musics
 Mute
 Muzik
 MyM

N

 Al Nahla
 Naked Punch Review
 Narrow Gauge and Industrial Railway Modelling Review
 Nature of Wales
 Nature's Home
 Neo
 Neon
 Nerve
 net
 New!
 New Escapologist
 New Humanist
 New Humanity
 New Internationalist
 New Liberal Review
 New Media Age
 The New Age
 New Civil Engineer
 The New Monthly Magazine
 New Scientist
 New Society
 New Statesman
 New Walk
 New Welsh Review
 New Worlds
 NGC Magazine
 Night Magazine
 Nimbus
 Nintendo Gamer
 NME
 Notion
 Nova
 Now (1996–2019 magazine)
 Now! (1979–1981 magazine)
 No 1
 Numbers
 Nuts

O

 The Observatory
 The Occult Review
 Octane
 Official Dreamcast Magazine
 Official Nintendo Magazine
 Official Xbox Magazine
 Oink!
 OK!
 The Oldie
 Once a Week
 The One
 One+One Filmmakers Journal
 Opera
 The Orchid Review
 Organ
 The Organ
 Outcast
 The Outlook
 Overload
 The Oxford and Cambridge Magazine
 The Oxford Magazine
 Oxford Poetry
 Oxonian Review
 The Oyster
 Oz

P

 Pagan Dawn
 Page 6
 The Pall Mall Magazine
 Parade
 Parliamentary Brief
 PC Format
 PC Gamer
 PC Magazine
 PC Player
 PC Pro
 PC Zone
 Peace News
 The Pearl
 Pentacle
 Penthouse
 The People's Friend
 Personal Computer Games
 Personal Computer World
 Petticoat
 The Philosophers' Magazine
 Philosophy Now
 Photo Bits
 Photography Monthly
 Photoworks Annual
 Physics World
 Pick Me Up
 Picturegoer
 Picture Show
 Pilot
 Planet
 Planet PC
 The Plantsman
 Play
 PlayStation Official Magazine
 PlayStation World
 Plays International & Europe
 Plus Magazine
 Pocket Gamer
 Poetry Life and Times
 Poetry London
 Poetry Wales
 Police Review
 Political Magazine
 Popular Astronomy
 Positive News
 The Poster
 Postscripts
 Power Slam
 Practical Boat Owner
 Practical Photography
 Practical Reptile Keeping
 Practical Wireless
 Pride Life
 Pride Magazine
 Private Eye
 Procycling
 Prog
 Prospect
 Psychologies
 The Psychologist
 PSM3
 Punch

Q

 Q
 Q News
 Quest
 Quest (esoteric magazine)
 The Quietus
 Quim
 Quiz Kids
 The Quorum
 QX

R

 Race Walking Record
 RadCom
 Radio Times
 Rail
 Railnews
 Railway Modeller
 Railways Illustrated
 The Railway Magazine
 Raw
 Raze
 Razzle
 The Reader
 The Realist
 The Rebel
 Rebel Magazine
 Recharge
 Record Collector
 Record Mirror
 The Red Dragon
 Red Pepper
 Red Rag
 Renewal
 Resident Advisor
 Restaurant
 Resurgence & Ecologist
 Retro Gamer
 The Revival
 Rhythm
 The Rialto
 Rising East
 Rock-A-Rolla
 Rock Sound
 Rouleur
 Rugby League World
 Rugby World
 Running Fitness
 RWD Magazine

S

 Saga Magazine
 SA Promo
 Sales Promotion
 The Salisbury Review
 Scarlet
 Science Fantasy
 SciFiNow
 Scootering
 Scotcampus
 The Scots Magazine
 Scottish Field
 Scottish Left Review
 Scream
 Screen International
 Searchlight
 Sega Force
 Sega Power
 Sega Pro
 Sega Saturn Magazine
 Select
 The Servant's Magazine
 SFX
 She
 She Kicks
 Shivers
 Shoot
 Shooting Gazette
 Shooting Times
 ShortList
 Shout
 Sidewalk
 Sight & Sound
 Signature
 Sinclair Programs
 Sinclair User
 Singletrack
 The Skeptic
 Skin Two
 The Skinny
 Smallholder
 Smash Hits
 Snooker Scene
 Socialist Review
 Socialist Standard
 Songlines
 Sonic the Comic
 Sony Magazine
 Sound on Sound
 Sounds
 Source, lifestyle magazine
 Source, photography magazine
 Spaceflight
 Speakeasy
 The Spectator
 Spiked
 The Spirits Business
 Splosh!
 The Spokesman
 Sport
 Sporting Cyclist
 Sporting Gun
 The Sporting Magazine
 SquareGo
 Square Mile
 ST Action
 ST/Amiga Format
 ST Format
 Stamp Collecting
 Standpoint
 Star Trek Magazine
 Starburst
 Start Art
 The Stamp-Collector's Review and Monthly Advertiser
 The Strand Magazine
 Stranger
 The Student Journals
 Studio International
 The Studio
 Stuff
 Stylist
 Suck
 SUITCASE Magazine
 Super Play
 SurfGirl
 Switch Player
 The Sword
 System

T

 T3
 Tait's Edinburgh Magazine
 Tate Etc.
 Take a Break
 Take One
 Tales of Wonder
 Tatler
 Ten.8
 Theatre Record
 Tilllate
 Time and Tide
 Time Out
 Times Higher Education
 The Times Literary Supplement
 These Football Times
 This England
 Tit-Bits
 Today's Golfer
 Today's Railways Europe
 Today's Railways UK
 Top Gear
 Top of the Pops
 Total!
 Total Carp
 Total Film
 Total Football
 Total Guitar
 Total PC Gaming
 Total Politics
 Town Hall Steps
 Tramways & Urban Transit
 Transmission
 Triathlon Plus
 Tribune
 TV & Satellite Week
 TV Choice
 TV Comic
 TV Quick
 TVTimes
 TV Zone
 Twikker

U

 Ulster Tatler
 Umbrella Magazine
 Uncut
 Undercurrents
 Urban Realm

V

 The Vagenda
 Vanity Fair
 Varsity
 Velo Vision
 The Vineyard
 Vision
 Vive Le Rock
 Vole

W

 Wales
 Wales Arts Review
 Wallpaper
 Wanderlust
 Wargames Illustrated
 The Week
 Well Red magazine
 Welsh Book Studies
 Welsh Living
 Welsh Outlook
 Westminster Review
 What Car?
 What Digital Camera
 What Hi-Fi? Sound and Vision
 What Investment
 What Satellite and Digital TV
 What's on TV
 When Saturday Comes
 White Dwarf
 Whitehouse
 The White Review
 Winning Bicycle Racing Illustrated
 The Wire
 Wired UK
 Wisden Cricket Monthly
 The Wolf
 Woman & Home
 Woman
 Woman's Journal
 Woman's Own
 Woman's Realm
 The Woman's Signal
 Women's Suffrage Journal
 Woman's Weekly
 The Woman's World
 Wonderland
 The Word
 Words & Pictures
 World Medicine
 The World of Interiors
 World Soccer
 The World Today
 Wormwood

X

 X
 Xbox World
 X-One
 Xplode Magazine

Y

 Yachting Monthly
 Yachting World
 Your 64
 Your Commodore
 Your Computer
 Your Family Tree
 Your Sinclair

Z

 Zembla
 Zero
 Zero Tolerance
 Zest
 ZigZag
 ZIP
 Zoo Weekly
 The Zoologist
 Zzap!64

See also
 British boys' magazines
 British Society of Magazine Editors
 List of newspapers in the United Kingdom
 List of 18th-century British periodicals
 List of 19th-century British periodicals
 List of early-20th-century British children's magazines and annuals
 List of magazines published in Scotland

References

 
Magazines